Bolo: Annals of the Dinochrome Brigade is a collection of science fiction stories by American writer Keith Laumer, published in 1976.

Plot summary
Bolo includes six stories about cybertanks called Bolos.

Reception
C. Ben Ostrander reviewed Bolo in The Space Gamer No. 12. Ostrander commented that "Since the Bolo is somewhat similar to the Ogre, we recommend this book to the readers who might not have heard of Keith Laumer, Ogres, or Bolos. It will be a rewarding experience."

Reviews
Review by Rob Chilson [as by Robert Chilson] (1977) in Delap's F & SF Review, January 1977
Review by Spider Robinson (1977) in Galaxy, May 1977 
Review by John Collick (1979) in Vector 96
Review by C. J. Henderson [as by Chris Henderson] (1982) in Dragon Magazine, October 1982

References

1976 short story collections
American short story collections
Science fiction short story collections
Works by Keith Laumer